A list of samurai from the Sengoku Period (c.1467−c.1603), a sub-period of the Muromachi Period in feudal Japan.

Samurai

A
 Akai Naomasa
 Akai Teruko
 Akao Kiyotsuna
 Akashi Takenori
 Akechi Hidemitsu
 Akechi Mitsuharu
 Akechi Mitsutada
 Akechi Mitsutsuna
 Akechi Mitsuyoshi
 Akiyama Nobutomo
 Amakasu Kagemochi
 Anayama Nobukimi
 Anayama Nobutomo
 Andō Morinari
 Asakura Kageaki
 Azai Hisamasa
 Azai Sukemasa
B
 Baba Nobuharu
 Ban Naoyuki
C
 Chaya Shirōjirō
 Chōsokabe Nobuchika
D
 Date Shigezane
E
 Endo Naotsune
G
 Gotō Matabei
H
 Hara Masatane
 Hashiba Hidekatsu
 Hattori Masanari
 Hayashi Narinaga
 Honda Narishige
 Honda Shigetsugu
 Honjō Shigenaga
 Hōjō Tsunashige
 Hōjō Ujikuni
 Hōjō Ujinori
 Hōjō Ujiteru
 Hoshina Masatoshi
I
 Ichinomiya Munekore
 Ii Naochika
 Ii Naomori
 Ii Naotora
 Ikeda Motosuke
 Imafuku Masakazu
 Inaba Yoshimichi
 Iriki-In Shigetomo
 Ishikawa Kazumasa
 Iio Noritsura
 Iio Tsuratatsu
 Isono Kazumasa
 Iwanari Tomomichi
K
 Kaihime
 Kakizaki Kageie
 Kani Saizō
 Karasawa Genba
 Katakura Shigenaga
 Katsurayama Ujimoto
 Kimura Shigenari
 Kobayakawa Hidekane
 Kojima Yatarō
 Kōsaka Masanobu
 Kuki Yoshitaka
 Kuki Moritaka
 Kumabe Chikanaga
M
 Maeda Nagatane
 Maeda Keiji
 Maeda Toshimasa
 Makara Naotaka
 Matsuda Masachika
 Matsudaira Nobuyasu
 Matsunaga Danjo Hisahide
 Mori Nagayoshi
 Mori Ranmaru
 Mori Yoshinari
 Mōri Katsunaga
 Mōri Motokiyo
 Mōri Yoshikatsu
 Murai Nagayori
 Murakami Yoshikiyo
N
 Nagano Narimasa
 Nagao Fujikage
 Nagao Masakage
 Nagao Tamekage
 Naitō Masatoyo
 Nakagawa Hidemasa
 Naoe Kagetsuna
 Naoe Kanetsugu
 Natsume Yoshinobu
 Niiro Tadamoto
 Nomi Munekatsu
O
 Obata Masamori
 Obata Toramori
 Obu Toramasa
 Oda Hidenobu
 Oda Hidetaka
 Oda Katsunaga
 Oda Nobuharu
 Oda Nobuhiro
 Oda Nobukane
 Oda Nobutada
 Oda Nobutoki
 Oda Nobuyuki
 Oniniwa Tsunamoto
 Oyamada Nobushige
S
 Saji Kazunari
 Saitō Toshimitsu
 Sakai Masahisa
 Sakuma Morimasa
 Sakuma Nobumori
 Sanada Nobutsuna
 Sanada Nobuyuki
 Sanada Yukimura
 Shibata Naganori
 Shima Sakon
 Shimazu Iehisa
 Shimazu Toshihisa
 Shimazu Toyohisa
 Sogō Kazumasa
 Sue Harukata
T
 Tachibana Ginchiyo
 Tachibana Muneshige
 Takeda Nobukado
 Takeda Nobushige
 Takenaka Hanbei
 Takenaka Shigekado
 Torii Suneemon
 Toyotomi Hidenaga
 Toyotomi Hideyori
 Tsutsui Sadatsugu
U
 Uesugi Kagetora
 Uesugi Tomosada
 Ujiie Naotomo
 Ujiie Yukihiro
 Usami Sadamitsu
Y
 Yamagata Masakage
 Yamamoto Kansuke
 Yamanaka Shikanosuke

See also

References

Samurai